Rangapani railway station is a railway station on Katihar–Siliguri branch of Howrah–New Jalpaiguri line in the Katihar railway division of Northeast Frontier Railway zone. It is situated beside Fulbari Ghoshpukur Canal Road, Rangapani in Siliguri of Darjeeling district in the Indian state of West Bengal.

Trains 
Few trains have stoppages in this station.

References

 Railway stations in Siliguri
Railway stations in Darjeeling district
Katihar railway division
Transport in Siliguri